Ella Gálová (born 25 February 2004) is a French-Slovak professional squash player. She achieved her highest career PSA ranking of 135 in February 2022 during the 2021-22 PSA World Tour.

References

External links 
 
 

2004 births
Living people
French female squash players
Slovak female squash players
People from Bratislava